Ballyness is a townland in the parish of Cloughaneely in the north west of County Donegal. Its Irish name is Baile an Easa meaning town of the waterfall. It is known for its salmon fishing at the bawann pool.

References

Cloughaneely
Townlands of County Donegal